Tattiawna Jones is a Canadian television and theatre actress. She comes from Manitouwadge, Ontario, Canada.

Filmography

Film

Television

References

External links

Living people
Actresses from Ontario
Canadian television actresses
Canadian film actresses
People from Thunder Bay District
Canadian people of African-American descent
Black Canadian actresses
Year of birth missing (living people)